Syllectra is a genus of moths in the family Erebidae. The genus was erected by Jacob Hübner in 1819.

Species
 Syllectra congemmalis Hubner, 1823
 Syllectra erycata Cramer, 1780
 Syllectra lucifer Moschler, 1890

References

External links

Eulepidotinae
Moth genera